Gert Wilhelm "Tank" van Rooyen (9 December 1892 – 21 September 1942), also known as George van Rooyen, was a South African international rugby union and rugby league footballer. His position was at lock.

Club career
At the age of 29, Van Rooyen moved to England in 1922 to play rugby league for Hull Kingston Rovers, where he won the 1922–23 league championship. He joined Wigan in November 1923, and went on to win the Challenge Cup in 1924, and two Lancashire County League titles in 1923–24 and 1925–26.

Tank van Rooyen played left-, i.e. number 11, in Wigan's 22–10 victory over Warrington in the Championship Final during the 1925–26 season at Knowsley Road, St. Helens on Saturday, 8 May 1926.

Tank van Rooyen played left-, i.e. number 11, in Wigan's 11–15 defeat by Swinton in the 1925–26 Lancashire County Cup Final during the 1925–26 season at The Cliff, Broughton on Wednesday, 9 December 1925. He spent six years at Wigan, making a total 178 appearances for the club.

In 1929, he joined Widnes on a free transfer, and became the club's first ever overseas player. In 1930, he won his second Challenge Cup in a shock 10–3 victory over St. Helens. He continued to play for Widnes until his retirement in 1933.

Representative career
In rugby union, Van Rooyen appeared for South Africa in two Tests in 1921. As a professional rugby league footballer, his only appearance at representative level was for Other Nationalities, playing in the team that beat England 23–17 at Headingley in 1924.

References

1892 births
1942 deaths
Afrikaner people
Cape Colony people
Hull Kingston Rovers players
Other Nationalities rugby league team players
People from Walter Sisulu Local Municipality
Rugby league locks
Rugby union locks
South Africa international rugby union players
South African people of Dutch descent
South African rugby league players
South African rugby union players
Widnes Vikings players
Wigan Warriors players
Rugby union players from the Eastern Cape